Christian Fechner (26 July 1944 – 25 November 2008) was a French film producer, screenwriter and director.

After starting off as an illusionist, he became a music producer with French singer Antoine. He transformed Antoine’s musicians, les Problems, into a band named Les Charlots.

Fechner produced such films as Les bidasses en folie, Les fous du stade, Bons baisers de Hong Kong, Viens chez moi, j'habite chez une copine, Papy fait de la résistance, Les Spécialistes, Marche à l'ombre, The Children of the Marshland, La Tour Montparnasse Infernale, Chouchou.

In 2005, he produced Les Bronzés 3: Amis pour la vie (and marked his last great success making nearly $151,211,264 at the box office.

Christian Fechner died of cancer on 25 November 2008.

Fechner had two children: film producer Alexandra Fechner and Maxime Fechner, owner of the fashion brand Kymerah.

Filmography

Producer
 1972 : Stadium Nuts (Les Fous du stade)  (dir. Claude Zidi)
 1972 : Les Charlots font l'Espagne (dir. Jean Girault)
 1973 : Le Grand Bazar (dir. Claude Zidi)
 1973 : I Don't Know Much, But I'll Say Everything (Je sais rien mais je dirai tout) (dir. Pierre Richard)
 1974 : La Moutarde me monte au nez (dir. Claude Zidi)
 1974 : Les Bidasses s'en vont en guerre (dir. Claude Zidi)
 1975 : Bons baisers de Hong Kong (dir. Yvan Chiffre) (also screenwriter)
 1975 : La Course à l'échalote (dir. Claude Zidi)
 1975 : Un Sac de billes (dir. Jacques Doillon)
 1976 : Calmos  (dir. Bertrand Blier)
 1976 : The Wing or the Thigh (L'Aile ou la Cuisse) (dir. Claude Zidi)
 1977 : L'Animal (dir. Claude Zidi)
 1978 : La Zizanie (dir. Claude Zidi)
 1979 : Bête mais discipliné  (dir. Claude Zidi)
 1980 : L'avare (dir. Jean Girault et Louis de Funès)
 1980 : Viens chez moi, j'habite chez une copine  (dir. Patrice Leconte)
 1981 : La Soupe aux choux (dir. Jean Girault)
 1982 : Ma femme s'appelle reviens  (dir. Patrice Leconte)
 1983 : Le Ruffian (dir. José Giovanni)
 1983 : Circulez y a rien à voir (dir. Patrice Leconte)
 1983 : Papy fait de la résistance (dir. Jean-Marie Poiré)
 1984 : Marche à l'ombre  (dir. Michel Blanc)
 1985 : Les Spécialistes  (dir. Patrice Leconte)
 1985 : Moi vouloir toi  (dir. Patrick Dewolf)
 1985 : Le Mariage du siècle  (dir. Philippe Galland)
 1986 : Les Frères Pétard  (dir. Hervé Palud)
 1988 : Black Mic-Mac  (dir. Thomas Gilou)
 1988 : Mes meilleurs copains  (dir. Jean-Marie Poiré)
 1988 : Camille Claudel  (dir. Bruno Nuytten)
 1991 : La Gamine  (dir. Hervé Palud)
 1991 : Les Amants du Pont-Neuf  (dir. Leos Carax)
 1992 : Justinien Trouvé ou le Bâtard de Dieu (also director and screenwriter) 
 1995 : Élisa  (dir. Jean Becker)
 1997 : Tout doit disparaître  (dir. Philippe Muyl)
 1997 : Witch Way Love (Un amour de sorcière) (dir. René Manzor)
 1998 : Une chance sur deux  (dir. Patrice Leconte)
 1999 : Les Enfants du marais  (dir. Jean Becker)
 1999 : La Fille sur le pont  (dir. Patrice Leconte)
 2001 : Un crime au paradis  (dir. Jean Becker)
 2001 : La Tour Montparnasse infernale  (dir. Charles Némès)
 2003 : Chouchou  (dir. Merzak Allouache)
 2004 : L'Incruste  (dir. Alexandre Castagnetti et Corentin Julius)
 2005 : L'Antidote  (dir. Vincent de Brus)
 2006 : Les Bronzés 3 : Amis pour la vie  (dir. Patrice Leconte)
 2006 : L'Entente cordiale  (dir. Vincent de Brus)
 2007 : L'Auberge rouge  (dir. Gérard Krawczyk)
Series:
 1988 : Sueurs froides  
 1988 : Palace  (dir. Jean-Michel Ribes)
 1989 : Lemmy come-back  (dir. Josée Dayan)
 1989 : David Lansky  (dir. Hervé Palud)

References

External links

People from Agen
1944 births
2008 deaths
French film producers
French male screenwriters
20th-century French screenwriters
French film directors
Burials at Père Lachaise Cemetery
20th-century French male writers